Harpooner was launched at Liverpool in 1771. In 1778 she became a privateer. She captured at least two French merchantmen before a French privateer captured her in January 1780. She became the French privateer Comptesse of Buzanisis, which the Royal Navy recaptured. Harpooner returned to online records in 1782, and in 1783 became the slave ship Trelawney, which then made two complete voyages in the triangular trade in enslaved people. She was no longer listed after 1786.

Career

Privateer
Harpooner entered Lloyd's Register (LR) in 1779 as a Cork-based privateer. Her master was G. Arnold, and her owner was Sheppard. She had undergone a thorough repair in 1778. 

Lloyd's List (LL) reported on  16 March 1779 that privateer Harpooner, of London, Arnold, master, had captured two French vessels, Friendship and Achilles. Friendship had been sailing from France to America with bale goods, ammunition, etc. Achilles had sailed from San Domingo with sugar. Harpooner brought both into Cork. On 13 June Achilles arrived at Portsmouth from Cork. The value of her cargo of sugar and coffee was put at £18,000.

The 1780 volume of LR showed Harpooners master as L. Hill, and that she was now based in London.

Capture
LL reported on 28 January 1780 that the French privateer Marquis of Seignety, of Dunkirk, with 160 men, had captured Harpooner, Hill, master, of 56 men and boys. The action had lasted two hours and Marquis had taken Harpooner into Havre de Grace.

On 9 December 1780  and  captured two French privateers behind the Isle of Wight after a short action. The two were Comptesse of Buzanisis, Lux, master, and Marques de Seiguley. Each had a crew of 150 men. Comptesse was armed with twenty 12-pounder guns and Marques was armed with twenty 9-pounder guns. In the action Solebay had one man wounded, and Portland had nine, two of whom died later. Comptesse of Buzanisis was believed to have been the English privateer Harpooner.

Slave ship
Harpooner reappeared in the volume of Lloyd's Register for 1782.<ref name=LR1782>[https://hdl.handle.net/2027/mdp.39015004281203?urlappend=%3Bseq=158 ''LR (1782), Seq.No.H276.]</ref> With Ramsey, master, she made a voyage to Quebec, Newfoundland, Oporto, and back to London. She then was registered at Liverpool in 1783 as Trelawney.1st slave voyage (1783–1784): Captain William Thoburn sailed from Liverpool on 23 March 1783. He acquired 470 slaves at Cape Coast Castle, and on 1 December arrived at Kingston, Jamaica with 447, for a 9.5% mortality rate. Trelawney left Jamaica on 24 January 1784 and arrived back at Liverpool on 10 April. 2nd slave voyage (1784–1786): Captain William Thoburn sailed from Liverpool on 2 August 1784. He started acquiring slaves at Cape Coast Castle on 27 December. Trelawney sailed from Africa on 1 September 1785 with 400 slaves, and arrived at Kingston on 12 November with 350, for a 12.5% mortality rate. She had arrived at Kingston with Thoburn, master, and arrived back at Liverpool on 5 May 1786 with Bean, master.

Fate
After her return from Africa, Trelawney no longer appeared in Lloyd's Lists SAD data, or in Lloyd's Register.

Notes, citations, and referencesNotesCitationsReferences'''
 

1771 ships
Age of Sail merchant ships of England
Privateer ships of Great Britain
Captured ships